Amadeus IT Group, S.A. is a major Spanish IT provider for the global travel and tourism industry.

The company is structured around two areas: its global distribution system and its Information Technology business. Amadeus provides search, pricing, booking, ticketing and other processing services in real-time to travel providers and travel agencies through its Amadeus CRS distribution business area. It also offers computer software that automates processes such as reservations, inventory management software and departure control systems. It services customers including airlines, hotels, tour operators, insurers, car rental and railway companies, ferry and cruise lines, travel agencies and individual travellers directly.

Amadeus processed 945 million billable travel transactions in 2011.

The parent company of Amadeus IT Group, holding over 99.7% of the firm, is Amadeus IT Holding S.A. It was listed on the Spanish stock exchanges on 29 April 2010.

Amadeus has central sites in Madrid, Spain (corporate headquarters and marketing), Sophia Antipolis, France (product development), London, UK (product development), Breda, Netherlands (development), Erding, Germany (Data center) and Bangalore, India (product development) as well as regional offices in Boston, Bangkok, Buenos Aires, Dubai, Miami, Istanbul, Singapore, and Sydney. At market level, Amadeus maintains customer operations through 173 local Amadeus Commercial Organisations (ACOs) covering 195 countries. The Amadeus group employs 14,200 employees worldwide, and listed in Forbes' list of "The World's Largest Public Companies" as No. 985.

History
Amadeus was originally created as a neutral global distribution system (GDS) by Air France, Iberia, Lufthansa and SAS in 1987 in order to connect providers' content with travel agencies and consumers in real time. The creation of Amadeus was intended to offer a European alternative to Sabre, an American GDS. The first Amadeus system was built from core reservation system code coming from System One, an American GDS that competed with Sabre but went bankrupt, and a copy of the Air France pricing engine. These systems were respectively running under IBM TPF and Unisys. At the first, the  systems were dedicated to airline reservation and centered on the PNR (Passenger Name Record), the passenger's travel file. Gradually the PNR was opened up to additional travel industries (hotels, rail, cars, cruises, ferries, insurance, etc.).

Initially  a private partnership, Amadeus went public in October 1999, becoming listed on the Paris, Frankfurt and Madrid stock exchanges. The firm diversified its operations with information technologies (IT) to deliver services  beyond sales and reservation functionalities, centered on streamlining the operational and distribution requirements of its customer base.

Since 2004, the company has invested €1 billion in R&D with its technology  increasingly using open systems which provide clients with more flexibility and features. , 85% of its software portfolio was open system based and it expects by the end of 2016 to have fully migrated away from mainframe-based TPF software.

In 2005, Amadeus was delisted from the Paris, Frankfurt and Madrid stock exchanges when BC Partners and Cinven bought their stake from three of the four founding airlines and the rest of the capital floated from institutional and minority shareholders. The transition from distribution system to technology provider was reflected by the change in its corporate name  to Amadeus IT Group in 2006. In 2009, Amadeus invested about €257 million in R&D. Amadeus was listed on the Spanish Stock Exchanges on 29 April 2010.

Amadeus has acquired: 
 2000: Vacation.com, the largest US marketing network for leisure travel
 2001: E-Travel, Inc., a supplier of hosted technology products for corporate travel
 2002: SMART AB, a travel distribution company in Northern Europe
 2003: Airline Automation (AAI), a robotic PNR processing company In 2006, its name was changed to Amadeus Revenue Integrity.
 2004-2008: Opodo, a European travel website, which it sold in February 2011 for €450 million
 2005: Optims, a European hotel software company
 2006: TravelTainment, a leisure content provider
 2008: Onerail, a rail IT software supplier
 2013: Travel Audience GmbH, an online advertising firm
 2014: Newmarket International, an IT provider for hotels
 2014: UFIS, an airport IT provider
 2014: i:FAO, a corporate travel buying software system
 2015: iTesso, a Property Management System provider for hotels
 2015: AirIT, property and revenue management software for airports
 2017: Navitaire, a provider for rail and Low Cost Airlines
 2017: Pyton, an online booking engine supplier
 2018: TravelClick, a provider of cloud-based services for the hotel industry, for $1.52 billion
 2022: Kambr, an airline revenue management solutions provider

In September 2014, Air France sold a 3% stake in the firm for $438 million. In November 2017, Amadeus invested in global mapping tech provider AVUXI.

Data centre
Amadeus has its own data centre in Erding, Germany,  two strategic operation centres in Miami and Sydney and local competency centres in Germany, Thailand, India, Poland, Colombia, Ukraine, and the United Kingdom.

Vulnerability discovered
On January 15, 2019, the hacker and activist Noam Rotem discovered a major vulnerability affecting nearly half of all airlines worldwide while booking a flight with Israeli national carrier El Al, he came across a significant security breach that allows anyone to access and change private information on flight bookings. The same breach was then discovered to include 44% of the international carriers market, potentially affecting tens of millions of travelers.

Operations

Distribution
Amadeus CRS is the largest GDS provider in the worldwide travel and tourism industry, with an estimated market share of 37% in 2009. As of December 2010, over  travel agencies worldwide use the Amadeus system and  airline sales offices use it as their internal sales and reservations system. Amadeus gives access to bookable content from 435 airlines (including 60 low-cost carriers), 29 car rental companies (representing  car rental locations), 51 cruise lines and ferry operators, 280 hotel chains and  hotels, 200 tour operators, 103 rail operators and 116 travel insurance companies.

Information Technology
Amadeus Altéa Customer Management System (CMS) is a software suite for airlines' sales and reservations, inventory management and departure control systems.  Using it, airlines outsource their IT operations onto a community platform which allows them to share information with both airline alliance and codeshare agreement partners.

It consists of four main modules: Altéa Reservation, Altéa Inventory,  Altéa Departure Control, ; and Altéa e-commerce.

In 2009, 238 million passengers were boarded by airlines using the system. It is developing similar systems for rail companies, hotel chains, airport operators and aircraft ground handling companies.

Contribution to open source projects
According to a May 2015 investigation, Amadeus has contributed to the Docker open source software project.

Business model and other business lines
The business model of Amadeus is booking fee or transaction based, which means that a fee is taken for each confirmed net booking made in the Amadeus CRS. 

In late 1990s, a business division specialized in e-commerce was created.

In 2000, Amadeus was awarded the development of two new operational applications for British Airways and Qantas: the inventory management and the departure control systems. These products were outside of the core expertise domain of Amadeus and were built with the expertise of the airlines.

In March 2015, Amadeus announced that Blacklane, a Berlin-based professional driver service available worldwide, would become their first fully integrated taxi and transfer service provider.

References

External links

Amadeus Hospitality Website

Software companies of Spain
Information technology companies of Spain
Hospitality companies established in 1987
Software companies established in 1987
Travel technology
Companies based in Madrid
IBEX 35
Companies listed on the Madrid Stock Exchange
Spanish brands
Spanish companies established in 1987
1999 initial public offerings
Computer reservation systems